Kayhan Al Arabi (English: Arab Cosmos or Arab world) is an Arabic language newspaper published in Iran. One of the country's oldest daily papers, run after the revolution by the office of the Supreme Leader, who appoints the editor-in-chief, currently Hossein Shariatmadari.

History and profile
Kayhan Al Arabi was founded in February 1943. The newspaper was mainly founded for the Arab minorities in Iran (like Ahwazi Arabs, Khamseh Arabs, Marsh Arabs, Khorasan Arabs) as well as Arabs from the Arab world in Iran and Arabic speaking people who are living in Iran too.

See also

 List of newspapers in Iran
 List of Arab newspapers

References

1943 establishments in Iran
Arabic-language newspapers
Newspapers established in 1943
Newspapers published in Tehran